was a sōsaku-hanga artist in 20th-century Japan. In 1938, he issued his first prints in his now famous "Winter in Aizu" series. Saitō was one of the first Japanese printmaking artists to have won at the São Paulo Biennale in 1951. 
Saitō's early works depict villages populated with local Japanese with a high degree of realism and three-dimensionality. His more mature works merge modern elements with Japanese tradition. His prints feature architecture and plant life flattened in two-dimensionality.

He spent time in Paris, and did a series there. Kiyoshi Saito's woodblock prints titled  “Autumn” are considered extremely rare and valuable.

Further reading
Harada, Minoru. The Life and Works of Kiyoshi Saito. Tokyo: Abe Shuppan, 1990.

References

External links
 Yanaizu Municipal Saito Kiyoshi Museum of Yanaizu in the prefecture Fukushima
  The Cats of Saito

Japanese printmakers
1907 births
1997 deaths
Artists from Fukushima Prefecture
Sosaku hanga artists